The Field Elm cultivar Ulmus minor 'Umbraculifera Gracilis' was obtained as a sport of 'Umbraculifera' by the Späth nursery of Berlin c.1897. It was marketed by the Späth nursery in the early 20th century, and by the Hesse Nursery of Weener, Germany, in the 1930s.

Description
The tree is distinguished by its long oval crown, but with thinner branches and smaller leaves than 'Umbraculifera'.

Pests and diseases
The cultivar is susceptible to Dutch elm disease.

Cultivation
The only known surviving specimens are in the United States and Scotland (see 'Accessions' and 'Notable trees'). Henry (1913) mentions no example at Kew, though a specimen had been planted there by 1902. A specimen obtained from Späth stood in the Ryston Hall arboretum, Norfolk, in the early 20th century.

Notable trees
Three trees supplied by Späth to the Royal Botanic Garden Edinburgh (RBGE) in 1902 as U. campestris umbraculifera gracilis survive in Edinburgh (2019). The two oldest, planted in the Garden itself (one of which is base-grafted), were long known by an updated version of Melville's name for them, U. plotii × U. carpinifolia  (:U. minor 'Plotii' × U. minor). It is known that Melville renamed some of Späth's trees at RBGE in 1958. These two were, according to one RBGE herbarium sheet, formerly called U. campestris umbraculifera (see 'External links'), the name of the parent tree (not present in RBGE) of 'Umbraculifera Gracilis'. A herbarium specimen from Amsterdam labelled U. carpinifolia Gled. f. 'Gracilis' var. (Späth) Rehd. matches the Edinburgh trees. Taken together, the evidence suggested that the three Edinburgh trees (the third, with smaller bole-girth, is on Bruntsfield Links) were the clone Späth supplied as U. campestris 'Umbraculifera Gracilis', an identification confirmed in 2016 by RBGE. It is not known why Melville was permitted to disregard the trees' documented Central Asian provenance, and pronounce them hybrids of Plot Elm, a local variety of English field elm.

Synonymy
Ulmus carpinifolia var. gracilis: Krüssmann , Handbuch der Laubgehölze 2: 534, 1962.
Ulmus camp. umbraculifera nova

Accessions

North America

Holden Arboretum, US. Acc. no. 60-164

Europe

Royal Botanic Garden Edinburgh, UK. Acc. nos. 19699358, 19699365

Nurseries

Europe
Centrum voor Botanische Verrijking vzw, Kampenhout, Belgium. ('Umbraculifera' listed separately to 'Umbraculifera Gracilis').
Baumschulen Bauch GbR, Rheinbach, Germany.

Notes

References

External links
  Sheet described as U. carpinifolia Gled. f. 'Gracilis' var. (Späth) Rehd. (Amsterdam specimen)
  Sheet described as U. carpinifolia Gled. f. 'Gracilis' var. (Späth) Rehd. (Amsterdam specimen)
  Sheet described as U. campestris umbraculifera (RBGE specimen C2717); renamed U. plotii × U. carpinifolia by Melville.
  Cultivar name not given (RBGE specimen C2714); renamed U. plotii × U. carpinifolia by Melville
  Cultivar name not given (RBGE specimen C2714); renamed U. plotii × U. carpinifolia by Melville
  Sheet described as U. campestris umbraculifera gracilis (RBGE specimen, 1902)
  Sheet described as U. campestris umbraculifera gracilis (RBGE specimen, 1902)
  Sheet described as U. campestris umbraculifera gracilis (RBGE specimen, 1902)
  Sheet described as U. carpinifolia Gled. var. 'Gracilis' var. (Späth) Rehd.; formerly named U. scabra Mill. × U. campestris var. umbraculifera and as U. umbraculifera gracilis (Haarlem specimen)
  Sheet described as U. carpinifolia Gled. cv. 'Gracilis' var. Späth; formerly known as 'U. montana umbraculifera gracilis' (Dahlem Hortus specimen, 1925)

Field elm cultivar
Ulmus
Ulmus Edinburgh Spath 1902